Ben-Horin is a Hebrew surname. Notable people with the surname include:
Aton Ben-Horin (born 1979), American music executive and record producer
Daniel Ben-Horin, American entrepreneur
Eliashiv Ben-Horin (born 1921), Israeli diplomat
Shomron Ben-Horin (born 1968), Israeli physician
Yotam Ben Horin (born 1979), Israeli musician 

Hebrew-language surnames